The 2012–13 season was the 67th season in HNK Rijeka’s history. It was their 22nd successive season in the Prva HNL, and 39th successive top tier season.

Competitions

Prva HNL

League table

Results summary

Results by round

Results by opponent

Source: 2012–13 Prva HNL article

Matches

Prva HNL

Source: HRnogomet.com

Croatian Cup

Source: HRnogomet.com

Friendlies

Pre-season

On-season

Mid-season

Player seasonal records
Competitive matches only. Updated to games played 26 May 2013.

Top scorers

Source: Competitive matches

Disciplinary record
Includes all competitive matches. Players with 1 card or more included only.

Appearances and goals

Penalties

Notes

References

HNK Rijeka seasons
Rijeka